"What a Crying Shame" is a song written by Raul Malo and Kostas, and recorded by American country music group The Mavericks. It was released in November 1993 as the first single and title track from the album of the same name.  The song reached number 25 on the Billboard Hot Country Singles & Tracks chart and peaked at number 6 on the RPM Country Tracks in Canada.

Music video
The music video was directed by Roger Pistole and premiered in December 1993.

Chart performance
"What a Crying Shame" debuted at number 75 on the U.S. Billboard Hot Country Singles & Tracks for the week of January 1, 1994.

Year-end charts

References

1993 singles
1993 songs
The Mavericks songs
Songs written by Kostas (songwriter)
Song recordings produced by Don Cook
MCA Records singles
Songs written by Raul Malo